Jean Stéphan Nabab (born 29 February 1992) is a Mauritian professional footballer who plays as a midfielder for Mauritian Premier League club Savanne and the Mauritius national team.

Club career
Nabab has played club football for CTN François Blaquart, Savanne, Cercle de Joachim, Curepipe Starlight, and Port-Louis 2000.

International career 
Nabab made his international debut for Mauritius in 2011.

References

1992 births
Living people
People from Savanne District
Mauritian footballers
Mauritius international footballers
Association football midfielders
Savanne SC players
Cercle de Joachim SC players
Curepipe Starlight SC players
AS Port-Louis 2000 players
Mauritian Premier League players